Spire Glacier is in Snoqualmie National Forest in the U.S. state of Washington and is on the west slopes of Spire Point. An arête separates the glacier from Dana Glacier to the east.

See also
List of glaciers in the United States

References

Glaciers of the North Cascades
Glaciers of Skagit County, Washington
Glaciers of Washington (state)